Nationality words link to articles with information on the nation's poetry or literature (for instance, Irish or France).

Events
 February 14 – French poet Pierre de Bocosel de Chastelard is discovered hiding under the bed of Mary, Queen of Scots. He is executed about a week later.

Works published

England
 Anonymous, The Courte of Venus, publication year conjectural, revised from the 1538  edition, with several other ballads
 Barnabe Googe, Eglogs, Epytaphes, and Sonettes (sources disagree on the year of publication; another source gives the year as 1562

Italy
 Antonio Sebastiano Minturno, L'arte poetica, criticism
 Giangiorgio Trissino, La poetica, Books 5–6 (Books 1–4 published in 1529), Italy

Other
 José de Anchieta, De Gestis Meni de Saa ("The deeds of Mem"), printed in Coimbra; written about 1560; Spanish in Brazil
 Pierre de Ronsard, Trois livres du recueil de nouvelles poesies, France, criticism

Births
Death years link to the corresponding "[year] in poetry" article:
 Michael Drayton (died 1631), England
 Heo Nanseolheon (died 1589), Korean scholar and poet who also wrote in Chinese, a woman
 Pierre Matthieu (died 1621), French playwright, poet and historian
 Josuah Sylvester (died 1618), England

Deaths
Birth years link to the corresponding "[year] in poetry" article:
 March 19 – Arthur Brooke (born unknown), English poet whose only known work is The Tragicall History of Romeus and Juliet (1562), considered to be William Shakespeare's chief source for his famous play Romeo and Juliet
 May 21 – Martynas Mažvydas (born 1510), author and editor of the first printed book in the Lithuanian language, including the first poetry
 August 18 – Étienne de La Boétie (born 1530), French political philosopher and sonnet writer
 William Baldwin (born c. 1515), English
 Tani Soyo 谷宗養 died (born 1526), Japanese renga poet; a rival of Satomura Joha; son of Tani Sobuko

See also

 Poetry
 16th century in poetry
 16th century in literature
 Dutch Renaissance and Golden Age literature
 Elizabethan literature
 French Renaissance literature
 Renaissance literature
 Spanish Renaissance literature

Notes

16th-century poetry
Poetry